The 1959 Segunda División de Chile was the 8th season of the Segunda División de Chile.

Santiago Morning was the tournament's winner.

Table

See also
Chilean football league system

References

External links
 RSSSF 1959

Segunda División de Chile (1952–1995) seasons
Primera B
Chil